Tunes is a suburban village in the borough of Arna in the municipality of Bergen in Vestland county, Norway. It is a part of the urban area of Arna, which has a population of 9,744.

References

Villages in Vestland
Neighbourhoods of Bergen